Todd Woodbridge and Mark Woodforde were the defending champions, but none competed this year.

Justin Gimelstob and Sébastien Lareau won the title by defeating Jim Grabb and Richey Reneberg 6–2, 6–4 in the final.

Seeds
All seeds received a bye to the second round.

Draw

Finals

Top half

Bottom half

References

External links
 Official results archive (ATP)
 Official results archive (ITF)

Doubles
U.S. National Indoor Championships